Rovečné is a municipality and village in Žďár nad Sázavou District in the Vysočina Region of the Czech Republic. It has about 600 inhabitants.

Administrative parts
The village of Malé Tresné is an administrative part of Rovečné.

References

Villages in Žďár nad Sázavou District